Charles Kraus may refer to:

Charles A. Kraus (1875–1967), American chemist
Charles Kraus (clown) (born 1946), American clown, magician, writer, and comedian

See also
Charles Krause (disambiguation)